Amelora oenobreches is a moth of the  family Geometridae. It is found in Australia.

External links
Australian Faunal Directory

Moths of Australia
Nacophorini
Moths described in 1919